Forest Lake is a suburb of Hamilton in New Zealand and was added to from around the 1930s. It is centred around Forest Lake Road, which is used by around 10,000 vehicles a day.

For quite a long time there was swamp in a large part and this has now been drained but Lake Rotokaeo remains and the ground remains quite damp in parts.

Forest Lake is named after the forest that once surrounded Rotokaeo.

History 
Until the 1863 invasion of the Waikato, the area lay between the pās of Mangaharakeke and Kirikiriroa on the lands of Ngāti Wairere.

The first housing was the Laurenson Settlement, on Forest Lake Road, near Walsh Street, built for workers between 1914 and 1921, under the Workers Dwellings Act 1910. The 1927 Hamilton map showed that most of Forest Lake had by then been built on an area north of Waitawhiriwhiri Stream in what had been Pukete Parish when the 1913 map was drawn.

Demographics

Forest Lake had a population of 2,487 at the 2018 New Zealand census, an increase of 198 people (8.7%) since the 2013 census, and an increase of 357 people (16.8%) since the 2006 census. There were 981 households, comprising 1,155 males and 1,332 females, giving a sex ratio of 0.87 males per female. The median age was 36.3 years (compared with 37.4 years nationally), with 516 people (20.7%) aged under 15 years, 492 (19.8%) aged 15 to 29, 990 (39.8%) aged 30 to 64, and 489 (19.7%) aged 65 or older.

Ethnicities were 73.7% European/Pākehā, 22.4% Māori, 4.7% Pacific peoples, 11.1% Asian, and 2.8% other ethnicities. People may identify with more than one ethnicity.

The percentage of people born overseas was 19.7, compared with 27.1% nationally.

Although some people chose not to answer the census's question about religious affiliation, 46.8% had no religion, 38.6% were Christian, 1.0% had Māori religious beliefs, 2.8% were Hindu, 1.4% were Muslim, 0.8% were Buddhist and 2.5% had other religions.

Of those at least 15 years old, 417 (21.2%) people had a bachelor's or higher degree, and 357 (18.1%) people had no formal qualifications. The median income was $31,500, compared with $31,800 nationally. 249 people (12.6%) earned over $70,000 compared to 17.2% nationally. The employment status of those at least 15 was that 984 (49.9%) people were employed full-time, 216 (11.0%) were part-time, and 81 (4.1%) were unemployed.

Education

Minogue Park 

Minogue Park was first bought by Hamilton City Council in 1959, then extended in 1964, 1973 (Waterworld, dog exercise area, luge track and Hamilton Model Engineers Club), 1975 Rotokaeo Lake, 1979 (netball courts, BMX track and car park, and end of Walsh Street, 1992 NZR land west of Rotokaeo and in 2008. In September 1979 it was named after a former Mayor, Mike Minogue. In 2004 it was classified as a reserve under the Reserves Act (1977). There was a speedway until 1979, now this has been replaced by Minogue Park netball courts, a destination playground and a BMX track. The Model Engineers Club moved to the park in 1983 and now has  of miniature railway track, a 1953 diesel shunter and the former Frankton signalbox. The playground was modernised in 2015. A cycleway is planned to link the playground with Nawton.

Rotokaeo Lake 
The Māori language-name  translates as Lake of freshwater mussels. Electro-fishing in 2009 found catfish, goldfish and mosquitofish, as well as eels.

The lake is supertrophic, sometimes resulting in algal blooms. Before urbanisation the lake probably also had a larger area of peat bog.

Before 2007 Mexican water lilies covered 86% of the lake, attracting many wading birds, but, after weed control, a 2008 survey found mallard, pūkeko, coot, black shag, little black shag, little shag, black swan, Canada goose, Japanese snipe and dabchick.

There is little submerged vegetation but kahikatea bush has been planted to the north and west, with baumea, kawakawa, mahoe, manuka, swamp millet and Hypolepsis distans, wheki, mata, turutu and silver ferns. The rest of the lake is surrounded by Carex virgata, kuta and makura sedges, Myriophyllum propinquum, pohuehue, flax, dwarf bog rush and swamp coprosma. Weeds remaining include alder, arum lily , crack willow, grey willow,  gorse,  Mercer grass, pampas, reed sweet grass, yellow flag iris, parrot's feather and Japanese honeysuckle.

See also
 List of streets in Hamilton
Suburbs of Hamilton, New Zealand

References

Suburbs of Hamilton, New Zealand